Darageh-ye Lotfollah (also Romanized as Darageh-ye Loţfollāh; also known as Darakeh-ye Loţfollāh) is a village in Almahdi Rural District, Mohammadyar District, Naqadeh County, West Azerbaijan Province, Iran. At the 2006 census, its population was 461, in 76 families.

References 

Populated places in Naqadeh County